Philbin or McPhilbin (Irish name: Mac Philbín) are Irish surnames, which is a patronymic form meaning "family of Philip".

The clan is of Norman origin, and is one of the Hibernicised branches of the Burke clan. Some would have later dropped the prefix. The clan descends from John MacPhilbín, son of Little Philip de Burgh and Grandson of William de Burgh, "of Athanchip". This was the Connacht Burke clan, who from the 14th century were prominent in Co. Mayo. Historian John O'Donovan, in the Annals of the Four Masters, lists MacPhilbín as one of the chiefs of the district then known as Síol Anmchadha in east Galway. He also claims there are two sept one in Co. Mayo and other in Co. Galway. The surname is also common in Co. Sligo.

In Connacht, Phillips is an Anglicisation of McPhilbin. Phillips was used interchangeably with MacPhillips, but later dropped the Mc/Mac prefix.

Surname
 Abie Philbin Bowman, Irish comedian and journalist
 Barry Philbin (born 1950), English rugby league footballer
 Darryl Philbin, fictional character from The Office
 Eugene A. Philbin (1857–1920), American lawyer
 Gerry Philbin (born 1941), American football player
 J. J. Philbin  (born 1974), American screenwriter
 Jim Philbin (born 1950), British fencer
 Joe Philbin (born 1961), American football coach
 Jonathan Philbin Bowman (1969–2000) Irish journalist and broadcaster
 Joy Philbin (born 1941), American television personality
 Maggie Philbin (born 1955), English radio and TV presenter
 Mary Philbin (1903–1993), American silent film actress 
 Patrick Philbin (athlete) (1874–1929), British tug of war competitor
 Patrick F. Philbin, American lawyer
 Philip J. Philbin (1898–1972), American Democratic U.S. Congressman
 Regis Philbin (1931–2020), American television personality
 William Philbin (1907–1991), Irish Roman Catholic bishop

References

Irish families
Surnames of Irish origin
Patronymic surnames
Anglicised Irish-language surnames